KABD (107.7 FM) is a radio station broadcasting an adult hits format. Licensed to Ipswich, South Dakota, United States, the station serves the Aberdeen area. The station is currently owned by Dakota Broadcasting.

On May 23, 2020, KABD rebranded as "107.7 The Shark".

Previous logo

References

External links
Dakota Broadcasting

ABD
Adult hits radio stations in the United States
Radio stations established in 1975